Taj Kuh may refer to:
 Taj Kuh, Birjand, South Khorasan Province
 Taj Kuh, Zirkuh, South Khorasan Province
 Taj Kuh, Yazd